Club Deportivo Aves Blancas de Jalisco, A.C. is a football club that plays in the Liga TDP. It is based in the city of Tepatitlán, Mexico.

History
The team was founded on March 11, 2000, the same year he was enrolled in the Tercera División de México. Unlike other clubs, this one has never tried to participate in another higher category.

In the 2015–16 season, the team reached the semifinals of the category after eliminating CDU Uruapan, Constructores de Gómez Palacio, Monarcas Morelia and Tecos, to finally be eliminated by the Leones Negros UdeG second reserve team. In the 2019–2020 season, the club temporarily paused its activity, to return to compete in the following season.

Stadium
The Estadio Corredor Industrial is a stadium located in Tepatitlán, Jalisco, Mexico. It has a capacity for 1,200 spectators and can reach a capacity of 5,000 in case of expansion work.

Rivalry
The club has a rivalry with Tepatitlán F.C., however, because the main teams both clubs dispute different categories, Aves Blancas must play the matches against the reserve team of Tepa, the match is known as Clásico Alteño or Clásico de Tepatitlán.

Players

First-team squad

References

External links

Liga MX Profile

Football clubs in Jalisco
Association football clubs established in 2000
2000 establishments in Mexico
Tepatitlán